Eavesdropping is the act of secretly or stealthily listening to the private conversation or communications of others without their consent in order to gather information.

Etymology
The verb eavesdrop is a back-formation from the noun eavesdropper ("a person who eavesdrops"), which was formed from the related noun eavesdrop ("the dripping of water from the eaves of a house; the ground on which such water falls").

An eavesdropper was someone who would hang from the eave of a building so as to hear what is said within. The PBS documentaries Inside the Court of Henry VIII (April 8, 2015) and Secrets of Henry VIII’s Palace (June 30, 2013) include segments that display and discuss "eavedrops", carved wooden figures Henry VIII had built into the eaves (overhanging edges of the beams in the ceiling) of Hampton Court to discourage unwanted gossip or dissension from the King's wishes and rule, to foment paranoia and fear, and demonstrate that everything said there was being overheard; literally, that the walls had ears.

Techniques
Eavesdropping vectors include telephone lines, cellular networks, email, and other methods of private instant messaging. VoIP communications software is also vulnerable to electronic eavesdropping via infections such as trojans.

Network attacks
Network eavesdropping is a network layer attack that focuses on capturing small packets from the network transmitted by other computers and reading the data content in search of any type of information. This type of network attack is generally one of the most effective as a lack of encryption services are used. It is also linked to the collection of metadata.

See also

 Cellphone surveillance
 Computer surveillance
 Covert listening device
 ECHELON
 Espionage
 Fiber tapping
 Global surveillance disclosures (2013–present)
 Katz v. United States (1967)
 Keystroke logging
 Listening station
 Magic (cryptography)
 Man-in-the-middle attack
 Mass surveillance
 NSA warrantless surveillance controversy (December 2005 – 2006)
 Opportunistic encryption
 Party line
 People watching
 Privacy
 Secure communication
 Speke Hall, containing a physical eavesdrop for listening to people waiting at the door
 Surveillance
 Telephone tapping
 Ultra

References

External links

Espionage techniques
Fiction
Plot (narrative)